Pseudochromis perspicillatus, the Southeast Asian blackstripe dottyback, or bandit dottyback, is a species of ray-finned fish from the Western Pacific Ocean, which is a member of the family Pseudochromidae.

References

perspicillatus
Taxa named by Albert Günther
Fish described in 1862